Fortunato Durante (1655–1714) was a Roman Catholic prelate who served as Bishop of Squillace (1697–1714).

Biography
Fortunato Durante was born in Albi, Italy. On 20 November 1697, he was appointed during the papacy of Pope Innocent XII as Bishop of Squillace. On 24 November 1697, he was consecrated bishop by Pier Matteo Petrucci, Cardinal-Priest of San Marcello, with Prospero Bottini, Titular Archbishop of Myra, and Giuseppe Felice Barlacci, Bishop Emeritus of Narni, serving as co-consecrators. He served as Bishop of Squillace until his death on 23 November 1714.

References

External links and additional sources
 (for Chronology of Bishops) 
 (for Chronology of Bishops) 

17th-century Italian Roman Catholic bishops
18th-century Italian Roman Catholic bishops
Bishops appointed by Pope Innocent XII
1655 births
1714 deaths
People from Albi